Kamaljit  may refer to

 Kamaljit Neeru, a Punjabi singer
 Kamaljit S. Bawa, Indian ecologist, conservation biologist
 Kamaljit Singh Garewal, Indian Judge
 Kamaljeet Sandhu, also spelt Kamaljit Sandhu Indian athlete
 Jay Sean, Real name Kamaljit Singh Jhooti British singer-songwriter, rapper
 Kamal Jit Singh - serving Indian Army Lt Gen and present GoC-in-C of Western Command